The Precision Time Protocol (PTP) is a protocol used to synchronize clocks throughout a computer network. On a local area network, it achieves clock accuracy in the sub-microsecond range, making it suitable for measurement and control systems. PTP is employed to synchronize financial transactions, mobile phone tower transmissions, sub-sea acoustic arrays, and networks that require precise timing but lack access to satellite navigation signals.

The first version of PTP, IEEE 1588-2002, was published in 2002. IEEE 1588-2008, also known as PTP Version 2 is not backward compatible with the 2002 version. IEEE 1588-2019 was published in November 2019 and includes backward-compatible improvements to the 2008 publication. IEEE 1588-2008 includes a profile concept defining PTP operating parameters and options. Several profiles have been defined for applications including telecommunications, electric power distribution and audiovisual.  is an adaptation of PTP for use with Audio Video Bridging and Time-Sensitive Networking.

History
According to John Eidson, who led the IEEE 1588-2002 standardization effort, "IEEE 1588 is designed to fill a niche not well served by either of the two dominant protocols, NTP and GPS. IEEE 1588 is designed for local systems requiring accuracies beyond those attainable using NTP. It is also designed for applications that cannot bear the cost of a GPS receiver at each node, or for which GPS signals are inaccessible."

PTP was originally defined in the IEEE 1588-2002 standard, officially entitled "Standard for a Precision Clock Synchronization Protocol for Networked Measurement and Control Systems" and published in 2002. In 2008, IEEE 1588-2008 was released as a revised standard; also known as PTP version 2 (PTPv2), it improves accuracy, precision and robustness but is not backward compatible with the original 2002 version. IEEE 1588-2019 was published in November 2019, is informally known as PTPv2.1 and includes backwards-compatible improvements to the 2008 publication.

Architecture
The IEEE 1588 standards describe a hierarchical master–slave architecture for clock distribution. Under this architecture, a time distribution system consists of one or more communication media (network segments), and one or more clocks. An ordinary clock is a device with a single network connection and is either the source of (master or leader) or destination for (slave or follower) a synchronization reference. A boundary clock has multiple network connections and can accurately synchronize one network segment to another. A synchronization master is selected for each of the network segments in the system. The root timing reference is called the grandmaster. The grandmaster transmits synchronization information to the clocks residing on its network segment. The boundary clocks with a presence on that segment then relay accurate time to the other segments to which they are also connected.

A simplified PTP system frequently consists of ordinary clocks connected to a single network, and no boundary clocks are used. A grandmaster is elected and all other clocks synchronize directly to it.

IEEE 1588-2008 introduces a clock associated with network equipment used to convey PTP messages. The transparent clock modifies PTP messages as they pass through the device. Timestamps in the messages are corrected for time spent traversing the network equipment. This scheme improves distribution accuracy by compensating for delivery variability across the network.

PTP typically uses the same epoch as Unix time (start of 1 January 1970). While the Unix time is based on Coordinated Universal Time (UTC) and is subject to leap seconds, PTP is based on International Atomic Time (TAI). The PTP grandmaster communicates the current offset between UTC and TAI, so that UTC can be computed from the received PTP time.

Protocol details
Synchronization and management of a PTP system is achieved through the exchange of messages across the communications medium. To this end, PTP uses the following message types.
Sync, Follow_Up, Delay_Req and Delay_Resp messages are used by ordinary and boundary clocks and communicate time-related information used to synchronize clocks across the network.
Pdelay_Req, Pdelay_Resp and Pdelay_Resp_Follow_Up are used by transparent clocks to measure delays across the communications medium so that they can be compensated for by the system. Transparent clocks and these messages associated with them are not available in original IEEE 1588-2002 PTPv1 standard, and were added in PTPv2.
Announce messages are used by the best master clock algorithm in IEEE 1588-2008 to build a clock hierarchy and select the grandmaster.
Management messages are used by network management to monitor, configure and maintain a PTP system.
Signaling messages are used for non-time-critical communications between clocks. Signaling messages were introduced in IEEE 1588-2008.

Messages are categorized as event and general messages. Event messages are time-critical in that accuracy in transmission and receipt timestamp accuracy directly affects clock distribution accuracy. Sync, Delay_Req, Pdelay_Req and Pdelay_resp are event messages. General messages are more conventional protocol data units in that the data in these messages is of importance to PTP, but their transmission and receipt timestamps are not. Announce, Follow_Up, Delay_Resp, Pdelay_Resp_Follow_Up, Management and Signaling messages are members of the general message class.

Message transport
PTP messages may use the User Datagram Protocol over Internet Protocol (UDP/IP) for transport. IEEE 1588-2002 uses only IPv4 transports, but this has been extended to include IPv6 in IEEE 1588-2008. In IEEE 1588-2002, all PTP messages are sent using multicast messaging, while IEEE 1588-2008 introduced an option for devices to negotiate unicast transmission on a port-by-port basis. Multicast transmissions use IP multicast addressing, for which multicast group addresses are defined for IPv4 and IPv6 (see table). Time-critical event messages (Sync, Delay_req, Pdelay_Req and Pdelay_Resp) are sent to port number 319. General messages (Announce, Follow_Up, Delay_Resp, Pdelay_Resp_Follow_Up, management and signaling) use port number 320.

In IEEE 1588-2008, encapsulation is also defined for DeviceNet, ControlNet and PROFINET.

Domains
A domain is an interacting set of clocks that synchronize to one another using PTP. Clocks are assigned to a domain by virtue of the contents of the Subdomain name (IEEE 1588-2002) or the domainNumber (IEEE 1588-2008) fields in PTP messages they receive or generate. Domains allow multiple clock distribution systems to share the same communications medium.

Best master clock algorithm
The best master clock (BMC) algorithm performs a distributed selection of the best candidate clock based on the following clock properties:
 IdentifierA universally unique numeric identifier for the clock. This is typically constructed based on a device's MAC address.
 QualityBoth versions of IEEE 1588 attempt to quantify clock quality based on expected timing deviation, technology used to implement the clock or location in a clock stratum schema, although only V1 (IEEE 1588-2002) knows a data field stratum. PTP V2 (IEEE 1588-2008) defines the overall quality of a clock by using the data fields clockAccuracy and clockClass.
 PriorityAn administratively assigned precedence hint used by the BMC to help select a grandmaster for the PTP domain. IEEE 1588-2002 used a single boolean variable to indicate precedence. IEEE 1588-2008 features two 8-bit priority fields.
 VarianceA clock's estimate of its stability based on observation of its performance against the PTP reference.

IEEE 1588-2008 uses a hierarchical selection algorithm based on the following properties, in the indicated order:
 Priority 1the user can assign a specific static-designed priority to each clock, preemptively defining a priority among them. Smaller numeric values indicate higher priority.
 Classeach clock is a member of a given class, each class getting its own priority.
 Accuracyprecision between clock and UTC, in nanoseconds (ns)
 Variancevariability of the clock
 Priority 2final-defined priority, defining backup order in case the other criteria were not sufficient. Smaller numeric values indicate higher priority.
 Unique identifierMAC address-based selection is used as a tiebreaker when all other properties are equal.

IEEE 1588-2002 uses a selection algorithm based on similar properties.

Clock properties are advertised in IEEE 1588-2002 Sync messages and in IEEE 1588-2008 Announce messages. The current clock master transmits this information at regular interval. A clock which considers itself a better master clock will transmit this information in order to invoke a change of master clock. Once the current master recognises the better clock, the current master stops transmitting Sync messages and associated clock properties (Announce messages in the case of IEEE 1588-2008) and the better clock takes over as master. The BMC algorithm only considers the self-declared quality of clocks and does not take network link quality into consideration.

Synchronization
Through use of the BMC algorithm, PTP selects a master source of time for an IEEE 1588 domain and for each network segment in the domain.

Clocks determine the offset between themselves and their master. Let the variable  represent physical time. For a given slave device, the offset  at time  is defined by:

where  represents the time measured by the slave clock at physical time , and  represents the time measured by the master clock at physical time .

The master periodically broadcasts the current time as a message to the other clocks. Under IEEE 1588-2002 broadcasts are up to once per second. Under IEEE 1588-2008, up to 10 per second are permitted.

Each broadcast begins at time  with a Sync message sent by the master to all the clocks in the domain. A clock receiving this message takes note of the local time  when this message is received.

The master may subsequently send a multicast Follow_Up with accurate  timestamp. Not all masters have the ability to present an accurate timestamp in the Sync message. It is only after the transmission is complete that they are able to retrieve an accurate timestamp for the Sync transmission from their network hardware. Masters with this limitation use the Follow_Up message to convey . Masters with PTP capabilities built into their network hardware are able to present an accurate timestamp in the Sync message and do not need to send Follow_Up messages.

In order to accurately synchronize to their master, clocks must individually determine the network transit time of the Sync messages. The transit time is determined indirectly by measuring round-trip time from each clock to its master. The clocks initiate an exchange with their master designed to measure the transit time . The exchange begins with a clock sending a Delay_Req message at time  to the master. The master receives and timestamps the Delay_Req at time  and responds with a Delay_Resp message. The master includes the timestamp  in the Delay_Resp message.

Combining the above two equations, we find that

The clock now knows the offset  during this transaction and can correct itself by this amount to bring it into agreement with their master.

One assumption is that this exchange of messages happens over a period of time so small that this offset can safely be considered constant over that period. Another assumption is that the transit time of a message going from the master to a slave is equal to the transit time of a message going from the slave to the master. Finally, it is assumed that both the master and slave can accurately measure the time they send or receive a message. The degree to which these assumptions hold true determines the accuracy of the clock at the slave device.

Optional features
IEEE 1588-2008 standard lists the following set of features that implementations may choose to support:
Alternate Time-Scale
Grand Master Cluster
Unicast Masters
Alternate Master
Path Trace

IEEE 1588-2019 adds additional optional and backward-compatible features:
Modular transparent clocks
Special PTP ports to interface with transports with built-in time distribution
Unicast Delay_Req and Delay_Resp messages
Manual port configuration overriding BMCA
Asymmetry calibration
Ability to utilize a physical layer frequency reference (e.g. Synchronous Ethernet)
Profile isolation
Inter-domain interactions
Security TLV for integrity checking
Standard performance reporting metrics
Slave port monitoring

Related initiatives
The International IEEE Symposium on Precision Clock Synchronization for Measurement, Control and Communication (ISPCS) is an IEEE organized annual event that includes a plugtest and a conference program with paper and poster presentations, tutorials and discussions covering several aspects of PTP
The Institute of Embedded Systems (InES) of the Zurich University of Applied Sciences/ZHAW is addressing the practical implementation and application of PTP
IEEE 1588 is a key technology in the LXI Standard for Test and Measurement communication and control
IEEE 802.1AS-2011 is part of the IEEE Audio Video Bridging (AVB) group of standards, further extended by the IEEE 802.1 Time-Sensitive Networking (TSN) Task Group. It specifies a profile for use of IEEE 1588-2008 for time synchronization over a virtual bridged local area network (as defined by IEEE 802.1Q). In particular, 802.1AS defines how IEEE 802.3 (Ethernet), IEEE 802.11 (Wi-Fi), and MoCA can all be parts of the same PTP timing domain.
SMPTE 2059-2 is a PTP profile for use in synchronization of broadcast media systems
The AES67 audio networking interoperability standard includes a PTPv2 profile compatible with SMPTE ST2059-2. 
Dante uses PTPv1 for synchronization.
Q-LAN and RAVENNA uses PTPv2 for time synchronization.
The White Rabbit Project combines Synchronous Ethernet and PTP
Precision Time Protocol Industry Profile PTP profiles (L2P2P and L3E2E) for industrial automation in IEC 62439-3
IEC/IEEE 61850-9-3 PTP profile for substation automation adopted by IEC 61850
Parallel Redundancy Protocol use of PTP profiles (L2P2P and L3E2E) for industrial automation in parallel networks
PTP is being studied to be applied as a secure time synchronization protocol in power systems' Wide Area Monitoring

See also
 List of PTP implementations
 Real-time communication

Notes

References

External links
 NIST IEEE 1588 site
 PTP documentation at InES
 PTP and Synchronization of LTE mobile networks 
PTP explained under the installation / maintenance point of view
 Hirschmann PTP Whitepaper
 PTP overview in Cisco CGS 2520 Switch Software Configuration Guide
 Perspectives and priorities on RuggedCom Smart Grid Research IEC 61850 Technologies
 Projects with Smart Substation Solution
 
 
 The White Rabbit Project PTP
 IEC&IEEE Precision Time Protocol'', Pacworld, September 2016]
 Tutorial on the fault-tolerant precision time protocol profiles in IEC 62439-3
 IEC 62439-3 Annexes A-E Redundant attachment of clocks and network management
PTPv2 Timing protocol in AV networks
FSMLabs: Single source IEEE PTP 1588 cannot meet financial regulatory standards

Synchronization
IEEE standards
Network time-related software
Network protocols
Application layer protocols